Antonio Fogazzaro (25 March 1842 – 7 March 1911) was an Italian novelist and proponent of Liberal Catholicism. He was nominated for the Nobel Prize in Literature seven times.

Biography
Fogazzaro was born in Vicenza to a wealthy family. In 1864 he obtained a law degree in Turin. He then moved to Milan where he followed the scapigliatura movement. In 1869 he was back in Vicenza to work as lawyer, but he left this line of work very soon to be a full-time novelist.

He began his literary career with Miranda, a poetical romance (1874), followed in 1876 by Valsolda, which, republished in 1886 with considerable additions, constitutes perhaps his principal claim as a poet. His novels, Malombra (1882), Daniele Cortis (1887), Misterio del Poeta (1888), obtained considerable literary success upon their first publication, but did not gain universal popularity until they were discovered and taken up by French critics in 1896.

In Fogazzaro's work there is a constant conflict between sense of duty and passions, faith and reason. In some cases this brings the tormented soul of characters into mystic experiences. His most popular novel, Piccolo Mondo Antico (variously titled in English as The Patriot or The Little World of the Past). The novel is set in the 1850s in Valsolda, a small community on the shores of Lake Lugano where he spent most of his life. Piccolo Mondo Antico has delightful evocations of the landscape, and strong characterizations which reveal the inner psychological turmoil of the characters.

Fogazzaro toured Italy proposing to reconcile Darwin's theory of evolution with Christianity. He found new interpretations in positivist and evolutionist theories. The Roman Catholic Church banned his novels Il Santo (1905) in April 1906 and Leila (1910) in May 1911. He died in 1911 in his birthplace, Vicenza.

Works

Novels
 Malombra (1881)
 Daniele Cortis (1885)
 Il mistero del poeta (The Mystery of the Poet, 1888)
 Piccolo mondo antico (The Little World of the Past, 1895)
 Piccolo mondo moderno (The Man of the World, 1901)
 The Poet's Mystery: A Novel (1903)
 Il Santo (The Saint, 1905)
 The Woman (1907)
 The Politician (1908)
 Leila (1910)

Other works
 Miranda (1874, verse romance)
 Valsolda (1876, lyrics collection)
 Fedele (1887, short story collection)
 
 L'origine dell'uomo e il sentimento religioso (1893, speech)
 Discorsi (1898, essays)
 Scienza e dolore (Science and Suffering, 1898, essay)
 Il dolore nell'arte (Suffering in Art, 1901, essay)
 Scene (1903, plays).
 The Trilogy of Rome (1907)
 Tales from the Italian and Spanish (1920)

Notes

Further reading

 Corrigan, Beatrice (1961). "Antonio Fogazzaro and Wilkie Collins," Comparative Literature, Vol. 13, No. 1, pp. 39–51.
 Crawford, Virginia M. (1899). "Antonio Fogazzaro." In: Studies in Foreign Literature. Boston: L.C. Page & Company, pp. 219–247.
 Egerton, Ruth (1911). "Fogazzaro's Last Romance: 'Leila'," The North American Review, Vol. 193, No. 665, pp. 508–514.
 Hall, Robert A. (1965). "Fogazzaro's Maironi Tetralogy," Italica, Vol. 42, No. 2, pp. 248–259.
 Hall, Robert A. (1978). Antonio Fogazzaro. Boston: Twayne Publishers.
 Kennard, Joseph Spencer (1906). "Antonio Fogazzaro." In: Italian Romance Writers. New York: Brentano's, pp. 215–248.
 King, Bolton & Thomas Okey (1913). "Literature." In: Italy Today. New York: Charles Scribner's Sons, pp. 322–352.
 Kuhns, Oscar (1904). "The Nineteenth Century." In: The Great Poets of Italy. Boston and New York: Houghton, Mifflin & Company, pp. 284–342.
 Laphan, L.E. (1906–07). "Fogazzaro and his Trilogy," Part II, Part III, The Catholic World, Vol. 84, pp. 240–250, 381–387, 462–476. 
 MacMahon, Anita (1911). "Antonio Fogazzaro: The Man and his Work, 1842–1911," The Catholic World, Vol. 93, pp. 516–527.
 Portier, Lucienne (1937). Antonio Fogazzaro. Paris: Boivin et Cie.
 Reid, Harriet (1906). "Antonio Fogazzaro," The Living Age, Vol. 251, pp. 139–145.
 Rose, William J. (1912). "Antonio Fogazzaro," The University Magazine, Vol. XI, pp. 92–103.
 Rumor, Sebastiano (1896). Antonio Fogazzaro. Milano: Casa Editrice Galli.
 Sharp, William (1912). "Italian Poets of Today." In: Studies and Appreciations. New York: Duffield & Company, pp. 337–393.
 Thayer, William Roscoe (1908). "Fogazzaro and his Masterpiece." In: Italica: Studies in Italian Life and Letters. Boston and New York: Houghton, Mifflin & Company, pp. 1–27.

External links

 
 
 Works by Antonio Fogazzaro, at Hathi Trust
 Works by Antonio Fogazzaro: text with concordances and frequency list
 Concordances and Frequency Lists of "Malombra"

1842 births
1911 deaths
People from Vicenza
19th-century Italian novelists
20th-century Italian novelists
20th-century Italian male writers
Italian male novelists
19th-century Italian male writers
Liberal Catholicism